The Secretary of Administration and Finance of Massachusetts is the head of the Executive Office of Administration and Finance, and serves as an advisor to the Governor of Massachusetts. Its current Secretary is Michael J. Heffernan, who has been serving since August 24, 2017.

Duties 
The secretary is in charge of formulating the governor’s budget plan, providing guidance on the economy, and implementing the state government’s revenue and budgets. The secretary also manages numerous state administrative agencies.

Managing Agencies 
Department of Revenue
Human Resources Division
Group Insurance Commission
Operational Services Division
Department of Capital Asset Management and Maintenance
Civil Service Commission
Public Employee Retirement Administration Commission
Teacher's Retirement Board 
Health Policy Commission
Developmental Disabilities Council
Division of Capital Asset Management

References